Styria (Serbo-Croatian and) is a state (Bundesland) in the southeast of Austria. Styria is bordered to the south by Slovenia, and clockwise, from the southwest, by the Austrian states of Carinthia, Salzburg, Upper Austria, Lower Austria, and Burgenland. The state capital is Graz.

Etymology

The March of Styria derived its name from the original seat of its ruling Otakar dynasty: Steyr, in today's Upper Austria. In German, the area is still called "Steiermark" while in English the Latin name "Styria" is used. The ancient link between Steyr and Styria is also apparent in their nearly identical coats of arms, a white Panther on a green background.

Geography

 The term "Upper Styria" refers to the northern and northwestern parts of the federal-state (districts Liezen, Murau, Murtal, Leoben, Bruck-Mürzzuschlag).
 The term "Western Styria" (Weststeiermark) is used for the districts to the west of Graz (Voitsberg, Deutschlandsberg, western part of the district Leibnitz). Because of the similar landscape with hills, valleys, wine and culture, the region in western Styria is also called "Styrian Tuscany".
 The districts east of Graz (Weiz, Hartberg-Fürstenfeld, and Südoststeiermark) are referred to as "Eastern Styria" (Oststeiermark).
The western and eastern parts of the district Graz-Umgebung (literally, surroundings of Graz) may or may not be considered parts of West and East Styria, respectively. The southern parts of the Duchy of Styria, which formed part of former Yugoslavia and later Slovenia (with the exception of World War II), were (and sometimes colloquially still are) referred to as "Lower Styria" (Untersteiermark).

History

Styria was inhabited by Celtic tribes. After its conquest by the Romans, the eastern part of what is now Styria was part of Pannonia, while the western one was included in Noricum. During the Barbarian invasions, it was conquered or crossed by the Visigoths, the Huns, the Ostrogoths, the Rugii, and the Lombards. Slavs under the domination of the Avars settled in the valleys around 600. At the same time, Bavarians under Frankish domination began to expand their area to the south and east, ultimately absorbing the Slavic population.

In 1180, Styria separated from the Duchy of Carinthia and became a Duchy of its own; in 1192 the Austrian Duke Leopold V became also Duke of Styria. Later, Styria formed the central part of Inner Austria.

Styria developed culturally and economically under Archduke John of Austria between 1809 and 1859.

In 1918, after World War I, it was divided into a northern section (forming what is the current Austrian state), and a southern one, called Lower Styria, now inhabited by Slovenians, and which was annexed to Yugoslavia, and later became part of Slovenia. As a result of the turbulence of the two world wars, the German-speaking population of Lower Styria, which had been concentrated in the cities, migrated out of the region or was expelled.

Economy

The Gross domestic product (GDP) of the state was 49.6 billion € in 2018, accounting for 12.9% of the Austria's economic output. GDP per capita adjusted for purchasing power was 35,400 € or 118% of the EU27 average in the same year.

As elsewhere in the developed world, there has been a shift away from the manufacturing sector towards the service sector in Styria. This has had negative consequences for the industrial regions of upper Styria which have suffered a steady decline in population in recent years.

In 2004, Styria had the strongest economic growth rate in Austria at 3.8%—mainly due to the Graz area which saw strong economic growth that year and has continued to grow in economic and population terms since then.

Styria is home to more than 150 clean technology companies of which one dozen are world technology leaders in their field. The revenue of Styrian cleantech companies totals €2.7 billion. This equals 8 percent of the Gross Regional Product (GRP) and is one of the highest concentrations of leading clean technology companies in Europe. The companies have an average (real) growth rate of 22 percent per year—well above the worldwide cleantech market growth of 18 percent per year. The region created roughly 2,000 additional green jobs in 2008 alone.

The Formula One Austrian Grand Prix has been held in the region, first at the Zeltweg Airfield in 1964 and then at the Osterreichring from 1970 to 1987. The sport returned to the circuit, now redesigned and rebranded as the A1-Ring, from 1997 to 2003. Formula One once again returned to the circuit, now renamed the Red Bull Ring, in 2014 and has been held at the track every year since. The COVID-19 pandemic saw the 2020 Formula One calendar massively revised, resulting in the Red Bull Ring becoming the first circuit to host consecutive Formula One World Championship Grands Prix, with the first round running under the Austrian Grand Prix name and the second held as the Styrian Grand Prix. This continued in 2021.

Administrative divisions
The state is divided into 13 districts (Bezirke), one of them a statutory city. There are 286 municipalities.

Statutory city
 Graz

Districts
 Bruck-Mürzzuschlag
 Deutschlandsberg
 Graz-Umgebung
 Hartberg-Fürstenfeld
 Leibnitz
 Leoben
 Liezen (with the subdistrict Gröbming)
 Murau
 Murtal
 Südoststeiermark
 Voitsberg
 Weiz

Demographics
The historical population is given in the following chart:

Politics

The state had been a stronghold of the right-wing Austrian People's Party (ÖVP) since 1945. However, Graz is markedly more left-wing than the rural districts of the province.

The governor (Austrian political term: Landeshauptmann) of Styria has typically been a ÖVP candidate. 

In the 2021 municipal election in Graz, the Communist Party of Austria (KPÖ) surprisingly took over first place from the ÖVP, thus pushing long-time mayor Siegfried Nagl (ÖVP) out of office. The result caused a sensation internationally. Elke Kahr led the KPÖ for a third time in the 2021 Graz local election. Despite opinion polling suggesting a victory for the ruling ÖVP, the KPÖ became the largest party with 28.8% of votes and 15 seats. After the election, the KPÖ entered into coalition talks with The Greens – The Green Alternative and Social Democratic Party of Austria (SPÖ). On November 13, 2021, the KPÖ, the Greens and the SPÖ announced their coalition: Graz gets a communist mayor with Elke Kahr.

Recent elections
In the 2005 elections for state parliament the SPÖ under their regional chairman Franz Voves won the majority after the ÖVP had damaged its credibility through scandals and the secession of a high-ranking party member who took part in the 2005 elections after setting up his own party. In these elections, the KPÖ also received many votes after it had gained much popularity through its role in local politics in Graz during the preceding few years. The two right-wing populist parties, the Freedom Party of Austria (FPÖ) and the Alliance for the Future of Austria (BZÖ), failed to win seats.

In subsequent elections in 2010 and 2015, the SPÖ, the ÖVP, and the KPÖ each lost between one fourth and one third of their shares of the vote relative to 2005. The FPÖ grew from 4.6 percent to 26.8 percent.
The current government of Styria is a coalition of SPÖ and ÖVP, with each party holding 4 seats of the 8 seats available. The governor, Hermann Schützenhöfer, is a representative of the People's Party. His deputy, Michael Schickhofer, is a SPÖ member.

Notable people
 Palman (fl. 1310–1363), knight and mercenary commander of the Serbian Empire
 Johann Joseph Fux (1660–1741), composer and music theorist, wrote Gradus ad Parnassum – a composition manual used by Beethoven and Mozart
 Archduke John of Austria (1782–1859)
 Peter Rosegger (1843–1918), honoured poet
 Johann Puch (1862–1914), founded Johann Puch Erste Steiermärkische Fahrrad-Fabriks-Aktiengesellschaft at Graz in 1899.
 Robert Stolz (1880-1975), composer born in Graz
 Karl Böhm, (1894-1981), conductor
 Erik von Kuehnelt-Leddihn (1909-1999), political scientist
 Bert Isatitsch (1911–1994), first president of the International Luge Federation
 Frank Stronach (b. 1932), founder of Magna International, billionaire
 Jochen Rindt (1942–1970), Formula 1 World Champion
 Dr. Helmut Marko (b. 1943), former racing driver
 Dietrich Mateschitz (1944–2022), founder and CEO of Red Bull, billionaire
 Klaus Maria Brandauer (b. 1944), actor and director
 Elfriede Jelinek (b. 1946), Nobel Prize in Literature winner
 Arnold Schwarzenegger (b. 1947), bodybuilder, film actor and former Governor of California
 Hugo Eberhardt (1948) (b. 1948), leader in the field of technical safety
 Getty Kaspers (b. 1948), lead vocals of Dutch band Teach-In, who won the 1975 Eurovision Song Contest.
 Eva Rueber-Staier (b. 1951), Miss Austria 1969, Miss World 1969
 Herbert Walzl (1959–2022), stage actor, theatre director and playwright
 Wolfgang Muthspiel (b. 1965), jazz composer and guitarist
 Ulla Weigerstorfer (b. 1967), Miss Austria 1987 and Miss World 1987
 Thomas Muster (b. 1967), former World No. 1 tennis player
 Renate Götschl (b. 1975), alpine skiing World Champion
 Elisabeth Görgl (b. 1981), professional alpine skier
 Christoph Strasser  (b. 1982), champion ultra cyclist
 Conchita Wurst (b. 1988), singer and winner of the Eurovision Song Contest 2014

See also
 Lower Styria

References

External links

 Imperial Austria: Treasures of Art, Arms and Armor from the State of Styria – The Canadian Museum of Civilization
 Official Tourism Website of Styria

 
States of Austria
Divided regions
NUTS 2 statistical regions of the European Union
Wine regions of Austria